The 1995 North Queensland Cowboys season was the first in the club's history. Coached by Grant Bell and captained by Laurie Spina, they competed in the ARL Premiership.

Season summary 
Two years after being admitted into Australia's premier rugby league competition, the North Queensland Cowboys played their first official premiership game on Saturday, March 11. Lead by inaugural captain and Ingham local Laurie Spina, the club faced the Sydney Bulldogs in front of a crowd of 23,156 at Stockland Stadium. There was no fairy tale beginning for the club, as centre Adrian Vowles was sent off for a high shot six minutes into the match and the Bulldogs won the game 32-16. Teenage fullback Damian Gibson, who was making his first grade debut, scored the club's first premiership try.

The club found little success during their debut season in the premiership. They began the season with seven straight losses before picking up their first ever win against the Illawarra Steelers at Steelers Stadium in Round 8. A six-game losing streak followed, which was then snapped in Round 15, when the club recorded their first ever home win, defeating the Western Suburbs Magpies. It would be the last time the club enjoyed victory that season, as they ended the year with seven consecutive losses. The Cowboys finished 1995 in 20th place, winning the dreaded wooden spoon, with just two wins from 22 games.

Former Eastern Suburbs Roosters prop Wayne Sing, who played 20 games, was named Player of the Year and Players' Player at the end of the season. The Cowboys would also have three players participate in the 1995 Rugby League World Cup. Jonathan Davies (a former Welsh rugby union international) and Kevin Ellis (who spent the entire season in reserve grade) both represented Wales, while Robert Piva (a recruit from Wakefield Trinity) represented Western Samoa.

Perhaps the one bright spot from the Cowboys' inaugural season was the debut of young Proserpine centre Paul Bowman. Bowman, who played seven games in 1995, would go onto captain the club and play 203 games over 13 seasons. Following his retirement in 2007, the club renamed their Player of the Year award the Paul Bowman Medal in his honour. He would join the club's coaching staff as an assistant coach and later their high performance manager, being on the staff for their NRL Premiership and 2016 World Club Challenge winning sides.

Milestones 
 Round 1: The club played their first premiership game (losing 16-32 to the Canterbury Bulldogs).
 Round 1: Damian Gibson scored the club's first try.
 Round 1: Damian Gibson and Ian Dunemann made their first grade debuts.
 Round 2: David Maiden made his first grade debut.
 Round 3: Glen Murphy made his first grade debut.
 Round 4: Steven Holmes and Justin Loomans made their first grade debuts.
 Round 5: Peter Jones made his first grade debut.
 Round 7: Justin Loomans became the first player to score two tries in a match for the club.
 Round 8: The club won their first game (def. Illawarra Steelers 14-10).
 Round 14: Michael Hogue made his first grade debut.
 Round 15: Faron Anderson and Reggie Cressbrook made their first grade debuts.
 Round 15: The club won their first home game, and scored 30 points in a match for the first time.
 Round 16: Paul Bowman made his first grade debut.
 Round 19: Ray Blackman made his first grade debut.
 Round 20: Aaron Ketchell made his first grade debut.
 Round 22: Andrew Meads and Noel Slade made their first grade debuts.

Squad list

Squad movement

1995 Gains

Ladder 

 Auckland Warriors were stripped of 2 competition points due to exceeding the replacement limit in round 3.

Fixtures

Regular season

Statistics 

Source:

Representatives 
The following players played a representative match in 1995.

Honours

Club 
 Player of the Year: Wayne Sing
 Players' Player: Wayne Sing
 Club Person of the Year: Paul Galea

References 

North Queensland Cowboys seasons
North Queensland Cowboys